Tony Dakota (born 1982) is an American actor known for his roles as Clavo on the television series 21 Jump Street and Georgie Denbrough in the 1990 television mini-series version of Stephen King's epic horror novel It. He also had voice roles in the animated television series Captain N: The Game Master, and had minor roles in television series such as MacGyver. In 2019, Dakota reprised his role as Georgie Denbrough in the short fan film, titled Georgie, based on the It television mini-series.

Filmography

Film

Television

References

External links

1982 births
American male child actors
American male voice actors
Living people
People from Auburn, Washington